Ömer Tanyeri (1900–1967) was a Turkish footballer who played as a forward for Fenerbahçe. His nickname was Beleş Ömer.

He scored 52 goals in 70 matches for Fenerbahçe between 1921 and 25, he furthermore won the 1922–23 Istanbul League Championship. He also played for Altınordu İdman Yurdu SK between 1917 and 1919 and won the 1917–18 Istanbul Football League Championship.

He was also a member of the General Harington Cup squad.

References

External links
 

1900 births
1967 deaths
Footballers from Istanbul
Association football forwards
Fenerbahçe S.K. footballers